Robert Ling Kui Ee (Pha̍k-fa-sṳ: Lìn Kwui-i̍t) is a Malaysian politician and currently serves as Kedah State Executive Councillor.

Election results

References 

Living people
People from Kedah
Malaysian people of Chinese descent
Former People's Justice Party (Malaysia) politicians
Malaysian United Indigenous Party politicians
21st-century Malaysian politicians
Members of the Kedah State Legislative Assembly
Kedah state executive councillors
1972 births